James Dadford (born 1769) was an English canal engineer.

Career

He was engineer of the Gloucester and Berkeley Canal from 1795 to 1800.

His father Thomas Dadford, and brothers Thomas Dadford, Jr. and John Dadford were also canal engineers.

See also
Aberdare Canal
List of canal engineers
Canals of the United Kingdom
History of the British canal system

References

English canal engineers
1769 births
Year of death missing